Positive Reaction is the debut album by UK Hip Hop group Caveman. The album, featuring jazz-influenced hip-hop, spent two weeks on the album charts and spawned the single "I'm Ready".

Track listing
"Troglodyte History" 1:35
"Victory (Remix)" 5:04
"Positive Reaction"4:35
"Cool (Cos I Don't Get Upset)"4:32
"Pages And Pages"5:29
"Fry You Like Fish (Jazz Remix)"4:29
"I'm Ready"4:01
"Caught Up"5:26
"You Can't Take It"5:23
"Desmond"3:56
"The Dope Department"5:10
"Back To Cause Mayhem"3:23
"Victory"5:26
"Introduction To A Caveman"5:26

Chart positions

Album

Singles

References

1990 debut albums
Caveman (group) albums